The Copa Casino was a casino located in Gulfport, Mississippi (USA). Prior to its destruction in 2005 by Hurricane Katrina, it operated a small casino that catered to local residents. The casino was originally housed in a former cruise ship, the Pride of Galveston, then later on a barge built to resemble an on-shore building, but which still floated on water to comply with Mississippi dockside gaming laws. The facility was located in a berth of the Mississippi State Docks.

History 
In the late 1980s, Rick Carter and two other partners, Terry Green and William Redd, bought a 40-year old ship to be used as a gaming property. The ship was renamed Pride of Mississippi in 1988 and Pride of Galveston in 1991.

As one of the two only casinos in Gulfport or Biloxi to not have an attached hotel (Other than Boomtown Casino), the Copa catered to a locals market, featuring low-minimum table games and relatively high paybacks on slot machines and video poker.

The storm surge from Katrina swept the barge onto the parking lot of the neighboring Grand Casino Gulfport, with the barge coming to rest against the Grand's parking deck.

In December 2005, Harrah's Entertainment announced a deal to sell the former Grand site and remaining assets to the owners of the Copa. The Copa owners are using the new site for the new Island View Casino, which has opened a temporary land-based facility (now allowed after regulations were relaxed after Katrina) in the Grand's former hotel on the north side of Beach Boulevard. The new Phase I facility features the company's first hotel.

References

Defunct casinos in the United States
Casinos in Mississippi
Buildings and structures in Gulfport, Mississippi